Crailtap is a skateboarding distribution company based in Torrance, California, United States. The distribution company is home to Girl Skateboards, Chocolate Skateboards, Royal Skateboard Trucks, and Fourstar Clothing.

Girl Skateboards

History
Girl Skateboards, the inaugural brand of the company, originated in 1993 after a selection of team riders from World Industries - notably Mike Carroll and Rick Howard - decided to found their own brand.

Howard explained in a 2000 interview:

Part of the reason we started Girl was so pro skateboarders would have a future. Take Royal, for instance. When Guy Mariano and Rudy Johnson's legs don't work anymore, at least what they've done for skateboarding and their ideas can continue with something they can fall back on. All the Girl Distribution companies are based around people who have helped Girl get to where it is today.

Howard and Carroll revealed in 2013 as part of the company's 20-year anniversary commemoration that the majority of the skateboard industry at the time was acrimonious towards the new enterprise. Carroll stated that a particular woodshop was threatened by another company and consequently severed ties with Girl, but that industry figure, Fausto Vitello, assisted Girl in numerous ways. Carroll explained that Vitello "...he always just, kinda, let us know that he had our back."

In addition to Howard and Carroll, the original Girl team consisted of Jovontae Turner, Eric Koston, Guy Mariano, Rudy Johnson, Tim Gavin, Tony Ferguson, Sean Sheffey, and Jeron Wilson. The company has evolved into a distribution company that distributes skateboard hard goods, skateboard videos and films, and soft goods. The Girl logo is similar to the symbol on women's bathrooms and was designed by Girl's in-house artist Andy Jenkins, who left the company to join Element Skateboards in October 2017. Named the "Art Dump," the design department of Girl was overseen by Jenkins and included contributions from artists such as Geoff McFetridge, Kevin Lyons, and Hershel Baltrotsky.

In the period leading up to the year 2000, Carroll and Howard were filming for the TransWorld SKATEboarding video Modus Operandi and their filmer, Ty Evans, invited a young unknown skateboarder named Brandon Biebel to accompany them on filming/skateboarding sessions. Biebel had moved from Chicago to California, US and had met Evans previously in Southern California. At the 2000 premiere of the video, Carroll asked Biebel to join the Lakai skate shoe team, followed by an offer to join Girl several months afterwards. Biebel was assigned professional status in 2002 and stated in a 2012 interview: "Girl, Lakai — that's a dream come true. I ain't never leaving that shit."

During the mid-2000s, Girl recruited new amateur riders Mike Mo Capaldi, Sean Malto, and Alex Olson, and established amateur Jereme Rogers was assigned professional status with the company in 2005. Rogers left the company in 2007 due to his dissatisfaction with his royalty payments, while Capaldi, Malto, and Olson were assigned professional status the following year.

Rogers later explained his issues with Girl in an October 2012 interview:

I was getting my cheque, just not my actual royalties. I got a three thousand dollar guarantee a month, which operated as a minimum; meaning I get that no matter what, but if I sell over the minimum, I get the extras - royalties kick in ... So what had happened was, they were letting my royalties fall back into the company to cover their overhead, which helped keep a boat afloat that had some leaks. For two years I apparently didn't break my three thousand dollar minimum ... Don't forget, we're taking about Girl here who sells all around the world ... So I inappropriately blurted out at Tampa 2007, after getting second to Koston, who had a flawed run, against mine which was flawless, that all I wanted was my royalties, when Rick Howard asked what I wanted after doing so well. The following month I got a six thousand dollar cheque ... The first time I broke my three thousand dollar minimum, "apparently", and on top of that, it was April; tax time. Coincidence ... Sure.

A statement from Girl was not released in response to Rogers's claims.

After winning the "Bang Yo' Self 2" contest, held by the Berrics website, in April 2009, Cory Kennedy was recruited by Girl and was assigned professional status in mid-2011. In regard to Kennedy's victory, the Berrics wrote: "Today, April 2nd, 2009, is the beginning of Cory Kennedy's tyranny over skateboarding. May God have mercy on our souls." Kennedy was unaware of his promotion, as he was deliberately informed by the company that a filming session was occurring at the North Hollywood skatepark; however, 20 of Kennedy's inaugural signature skateboard deck were given to random people at the park who skated on the decks, together with Girl team members who were also using the deck, while Kennedy remained unaware. After 20 minutes, Kennedy eventually realized that his name was written on the decks.

In May 2013, longtime Girl team riders Brian Anderson and Olson announced that they had parted ways with the company as a board sponsor. Anderson explained that he would be pursuing a creative venture of his own, while Olson did not disclose a subsequent sponsor and stated: "I wouldn't be where I am today without the help and motivation of Girl." Following the announcement of Anderson's own skateboard deck company "3D Skateboards" and the recruitment of Olson (who left to form his own brand shortly afterwards), the former Girl team member affirmed that his departure was not due to dissatisfaction:

There was absolutely nothing wrong with the way things were going with Girl. That's why it was hard to go through with everything because we're all really close friends and I love those guys so much. I just felt like I wanted to do something for myself, instead of in a few years realizing that I can't jump down stairs when I'm 45, and I kinda wanted to have my own thing started by the time that happens. I have a few Girl tattoos, and I'm happy I have them because it's great memories of fun trips and great years.

When asked to comment on the departure of team members in August 2013, Carroll stated, "When people quit for other companies for just more money, or something, that's stupid. But, if someone quits because they don't feel right on a team, or something, then, and for another company, that makes sense."

As of August 2013, the Girl brand has existed for 20 years and Howard explained his perspective on the longevity of Girl in an interview with Route One magazine:

We've grown up together doing this, so, yeah, we're just lucky to work with our friends, you know? And all share the same things in what we do here, so ... That's how we started and that's what we do to this day. This is up for everyone to have fun with, you know?

In 2015 Girl announced the departure of Koston and Mariano.

Through 2016 to 2018 Girl added four new amateurs to the team; Simon Bannerot, Tyler "Manchild" Pacheco, Griffin Gass, and Niels Bennett. They also welcomed Andrew Brophy to the team following the end of Cliché Skateboards. Girl released their first full-length video since Pretty Sweet in October 2018, titled, "Doll", which formally introduces Griffin and Niels to the team.

In 2019, Girl added the first ever girl to the team, Breana Geering, from Vancouver, Canada.

In 2020, Girl releases "Nervous Circus" and turn Griffin Gass and Niels Bennett pro.

Team Riders 
Professional
Mike Carroll
Rick Howard
Jeron Wilson
Rick McCrank
Sean Malto
Mike Mo Capaldi
Cory Kennedy
Cody Chapman
Andrew Brophy
Tyler Pacheco
Simon Bannerot
Griffin Gass
Niels Bennett
Breana Geering
Amateur
Rowan Davis
Former
Jovantae Turner
Tim Gavin
Sean Sheffey
Rudy Johnson
Colin McKay
Paul Rodriguez (skateboarder)
Jereme Rogers
Alex Olson
Brian Anderson
Guy Mariano
Eric Koston
Robbie McKinley
Tony Ferguson
Brandon Biebel

Videography
1994: Goldfish
1996: Mouse
1999: Girl in South Africa 
2000: Euro Blitz 
2003: Harsh Euro Barge
2003: Yeah Right!
2004: High Fives Up The i-5
2005: Oi! Meets Girl!
2005: What Tour?
2006: Yes We CANada
2007: Badass Meets Dumbass (with Chocolate skateboards)
2007: We're OK EurOK (with Chocolate Skateboards) 
2008: Beauty and the Beast (with Anti-Hero Skateboards)
2008: Yanks On Planks
2009: Beauty and the Beast 2 (with Anti-Hero Skateboards)
2010: Beauty and the Beast 3 (with Anti-Hero Skateboards)
2010: Der Bratwurst Tour Ever (with Chocolate skateboards)
2010: Outbackwards
2011: Unbeleafable (3D film)
2012: Pretty Sweet (with Chocolate skateboards)
2013: Pretty Sweet US Tour (with Chocolate Skateboards) 
2014: Wet Dream: A Skateboard Tale 
2015: Going Dumb Up The 101 (with Chocolate Skateboards) 
2016: Girl & Chocolate in Mexico (with Chocolate Skateboards) 
2016: Girl Skates Washington State 
2017: When Nature Calls 
2018: Chickity China (with Chocolate Skateboards) 
2018: Don't Mess With Girl 
2018: Out For A Rip 
2018: Doll 
2019: Bangers & Mash 
2019: Melbourne Identity 
2020: Nervous Circus 
2020: Pretty Stoned (with Volcom) 
2022: In Real Life

Chocolate Skateboards

History
In the year following the formation of Girl, the Chocolate brand was introduced, as the growth of Girl inspired the creation of another brand, with the recruitment of additional riders and personnel. Howard and Carroll explained in 2013 that they were compelled to start the brand after an experience in which they were forced to leave behind professional skateboarder Chico Brenes, a close friend at the time, as they embarked on a skateboard tour, as he was unable to fit into the tour van.

The original team consisted of Brenes, Daniel Castillo, Paulo Diaz, Richard Mulder, Shamil Randle, Gabriel Rodriguez, and Ben Sanchez. In 2009, a 15-year anniversary advertisement was published in which a portrait of the team was depicted — the two riders who were not present at the photo shoot, Anthony Pappalardo and Jesus Fernandez, were represented by framed portrait photographs. The Chocolate team made guest appearances in Girl videos, such as Goldfish and Yeah Right!, in addition to producing its own videos, Las Nueve Vidas De Paco (1995), The Chocolate Tour (1999), Se Habla Canuck (2004), and Hot Chocolate (2004), and A Little Chunk of Chocolate (2006).

On November 12, 2013, a video was published on the Crailtap YouTube channel, the official channel of the Girl Distribution Company, in which Jerry Hsu is officially revealed as the new professional for the Chocolate skateboard company. The video skit features Carroll, Marc Johnson, Stevie Perez, Chris Roberts, Elijah Berle, and Gino Ianucci. In the video, the skateboarders (minus Ianucci, who arrives at the end of the skit) discuss a new professional team member for the Chocolate brand in a Mexican restaurant. A list of criteria is articulated by the group's members—a list that is associated with Hsu's career thus far — and Hsu then appears as the waiter. Hsu and fellow Chocolate rider, Elijah Berle, left the company in 2017.

The Chocolate brand celebrated its 20th anniversary in August 2014 with an art show, held at the Art Share Gallery in Los Angeles, U.S. The Berrics website conducted interviews with artist Evan Hecox and Brenes at the event.

Following the release of Lakai Limited Footwear's "The Flare" video, Chocolate turned Yonnie Cruz pro in the summer of 2017. In 2019, Chocolate released the "T.O.N.Y. Tour" video, introducing amateurs Hakeem Ducksworth, James Capps, and Carl Aikens to the team.

In 2021, Chocolate turned James Capps and Carlisle Aikens pro, added Jordan Trahan to the team, and released their first full-length video since Pretty Sweet (2012), titled "Bunny Hop".

Team Riders 
Professional
 Chris Roberts (skateboarder)
 Kenny Anderson
 Jesus Fernandez
 Justin Eldridge
 Vincent Alvarez
 Stevie Perez
 Raven Tershy
 James Capps
 Jordan Trahan
 Carl Aikens
 Erik Herrera
Amateur
 TBA

Former
Keenan Milton
 Daniel Castillo
 Paulo Diaz 
 Richard Mulder 
 Shamil Randle
 Gabriel Rodriguez 
Ben Sanchez
 Ricardo Carvalho
 Mike York 
 Stevie Williams 
 Scott Johnston
 Devine Calloway
 Anthony Pappalardo 
Gino Iannucci
 Marc Johnson
 Elijah Berle
Jerry Hsu
Hakeem Ducksworth
Yonnie Cruz

Videography
 1995: Las Nueve Vidas De Paco
 1999: The Chocolate Tour
2004: Se Habla Canuck
 2004: Hot Chocolate
2006: A Little Chunk of Chocolate
2006: Hittin' Britain & Oui Will Rock You
 2007: Badass Meets Dumbass (with Girl Skateboards)
2007: We're OK EurOK (with Girl Skateboards) 
 2008: Felicità (trailer with Italian artist Bugo)
2010: Der Bratwurst Tour Ever
 2012: Pretty Sweet
2013: Pretty Sweet US Tour (with Girl Skateboards) 
2013: Trunk Boyz In Puerto Rico 
2015: Going Dumb Up The 101 (with Girl Skateboards) 
2016: Chocolate Skateboards in Miami 
2016: Girl & Chocolate in Mexico (with Girl Skateboards) 
2018: Chickity China (with Girl Skateboards) 
2019: T.O.N.Y. Tour 
2021: Bunny Hop 
2022: Upper Cruster

Fourstar Clothing

Founded by Eric Koston and Guy Mariano in April 1996, as the pair sought to move beyond cargo pants and T-shirts to create affordable clothing for skateboarders. Fourstar Clothing have not released a new collection since Holiday 2016.

Past Team Riders
Eric Koston
Guy Mariano
Ishod Wair
Tony Trujillo
Rick Howard
Mike Carroll
Brian Anderson
Keenan Milton
Shane O' Neill
Tyler Bledsoe
Andrew Brophy
Sean Malto
Lucas Puig
Frank Gerwer
Max Schaaf
Mark Gonzales
Cory Kennedy
Paul Rodriguez 
PJ Ladd
Andrew Reynolds 
Colin McKay

Videography
Fourstar Clothing Tradeshow Promo (1999)
Super Champion Funzone (2005)
Spring/Summer 2005 Catalog Shoot (2005)
Fall/Winter 2005 Catalog Shoot (2005)
North of Everything (2008)
A Tribe Called Mapquest (2008)
Gang of Fourstar (2009)
Leisure Till You Seizure (2011)
Hawaii Four-0 (2012)
4 Live Crew (2012)
Crocodile Done Deal (2014) 
Obtuse Moments (2015)

Lakai Limited Footwear
Lakai Limited Footwear is a skateboard footwear company based in Torrance, California, US, that was founded by Carroll and Howard in 1999.

Team Riders 
Pro
Mike Carroll
Rick Howard
Vincent Alvarez
Riley Hawk
Stevie Perez
Simon Bannerot
Tyler "Manchild" Pacheco
Griffin Gass
Cody Chapman
James Capps
AM
Jimmy Wilkins
Nico Hiraga
Greg DeHart
Former
 Danny Garcia
 Scott Johnston
 JJ Rousseau
 Alex Olson
 Anthony Pappalardo
 Lucas Puig
 Eric Koston
Mike Mo Capaldi
Rob Welsh
Cairo Foster
Jeff Lenoce
Karsten Kleppan
Guy Mariano
Brandon Biebel
Marc Johnson
JB Gillet
Daniel Espinoza
Raven Tershy
Nick Jensen
Ronnie Sandoval
Jon Sciano
Sebo Walker
Danny Brady
Jesus Fernandez
Rick McCrank
Tony Hawk
Yonnie Cruz

Videography

 Australia/NZ Tour (2001)
 Beware Of The Flare (2002)
 Canada Eh? (2004) 
 The Red Flare Tour (2006)
 EMB Carroll (2007)
 Fully Flared (2007)
 The Final Flare! (2008)
 Fully Trippin' in Malaga (2008)
 Voltage (2010)
 Am I Am (2010)
 2010 Video Collection (2010)
 Transworld's Skate & Create "LAKAIromania" (2010) 
 Getting Nordical Tour (2010) 
 Stupor Tour (2014) 
 Stay Flared (2015) (with Emerica Footwear) 
 The Flare (2017) 
 Flare Canada (2019) 
 Street Safari (2019)

Royal Trucks 
Royal Trucks is a company in Torrance, California that makes skateboard trucks, the axle-like structures to which a skateboard's wheels are attached, and apparel. According to Transworld Business and Chocolate Skateboards, the company was founded in 1999 by Rudy Johnson and Guy Mariano.

Team Riders 
 Griffin Gass
 Vincent Alvarez
 Rowan Davis
 Zach Allen
 Stevie Perez
 Andrew Brophy
 Mike Carroll
 Rick Howard
 Nico Hiraga
 Jeron Wilson
Mike Mo Capaldi
 Justin Eldridge
 Jesus Fernandez
Cory Kennedy
 Kevin Taylor
 Josh Gomez
 Leo Takayama
 Diego Johnson

Girl Films & Chocolate Cinema
Girl Films has been the company name that has been used for all of the Girl Distribution video productions. In early 2013, longtime videographer/director/editor for Girl Films Ty Evans announced his departure from the company and Italian videographer/director Federico Vitetta has become more involved with film work for the company since Evans' departure. Evans was primarily responsible for the Yeah Right!, Hot Chocolate, Fully Flared, and Pretty Sweet productions.

Pretty Sweet 
Both the Girl and Chocolate teams were involved with the filming of the Pretty Sweet video production — the world premiere of the video occurred on November 16, 2012 at the Orpheum Theater in Los Angeles, California, US (the commercial release date for the video is November 27, 2012). The video includes parts from the team members of both brands and was the first full-length Girl Distribution Company video to feature a part from Sean Malto.

Filming for Pretty Sweet occurred in numerous global locations, including Nicaragua, Costa Rica, Panama, China, Barcelona, and Berlin. Evans also explained that, due to commitments for his next feature film, Jonze's involvement was limited, but he conducted a week's worth of filming, contributed ideas, and participated in creative meetings for the production.

The video was a winner at the 15th Annual Transworld SKATEboarding Awards event, held at the Avalon Hollywood in Hollywood, California, US, and received the Best Video award over DGK's Parental Advisory and Transworld's The Cinematographer Project. In February 2013, Evans predicted that Pretty Sweet would surpass Lakai's Fully Flared as the best-selling skateboard video of all time. He explained that two months after the video's release it had achieved similar sales figures to the Lakai film, and that the video "was #1 in the Sports and Documentary categories on iTunes and overall out of all the films it was #2."

Causes
In 2012, Girl was listed as a partner of the (RED) campaign, together with other brands such as Nike, American Express, and Converse. The campaign's mission is to prevent the transmission of HIV from mother to child by 2015 (the campaign's byline is "Fighting For An AIDS Free Generation").

References

External links
Crailtap official website
Girl Skateboards official website
Chocolate Skateboards official website
Royal Skateboard Truck Co. official website

Companies based in Los Angeles County, California
Companies established in 1993
Skateboarding companies
Companies based in Torrance, California